Candydrip is the second studio album by American singer-songwriter Lucky Daye, released on Keep Cool Records and RCA Records on March 10, 2022. The album reached number 69 on the Billboard 200 chart. It features collaborations with Smino, Lil Durk, Chiiild and Alex Isley, and is produced by D'Mile. The song "Guess" samples "U Don't Have to Call" by Usher.

Release 
Lucky Daye announced the deluxe version of the album on November 16, along with the release of a music video for the original album track "Fuckin' Sound" directed by Kanya Iwana. The deluxe album released December 9, featuring four additional songs including the "original version" of "NWA" as well as "These Signs" and "Apply Pressure".

Style 
The album, like Lucky Daye's previous work, is considered contemporary R&B. It is said to expand on his sound "only slightly", with the typical laidback vibe and "tasteful" instrumentation infused with "gently plucked acoustic guitar and cinematic strings alongside textural pitch-shifted vocals and rhythmic backbeats" by producer D'Mile. The album takes influence from Soundcloud rap's lo-fi qualities, with some tracks such as "NWA" incorporating elements of trap.

Track listing

Charts

References 

2022 albums
RCA Records albums
Contemporary R&B albums by American artists
Albums produced by D'Mile
Lucky Daye albums